Ahmadabad-e Kohpayeh  ('''''') is a village in Rahmat Rural District, Seyyedan District, Marvdasht County, Fars Province, Iran.

References 

Populated places in Marvdasht County